"Shut Up (and Sleep with Me)" is a song by German Eurodance artist Sin With Sebastian, released in May 1995 as the lead single from his debut album, Golden Boy (1995). It features classic opera vocals by singer Donna Lynn Bowers aka Steve. Co-produced by Inga Humpe and Sebastian Roth, who also wrote it, the song became a Europe-wide hit, reaching number-one in Austria, Finland, Lithuania and Spain. Outside Europe, it also reached number-one in Mexico. It was nominated to the 1996 Echo Awards for the best German dance single.

Critical reception
Larry Flick from Billboard wrote, "Here is a novelty number for the Euro-pop twirler in all of us. The vocals are utter camp, lying somewhere between Marc Almond and Jimmy Somerville in style, and the groove is springy and fun." Matthew J. Palm from The Ithaca Journal complimented it as a "stellar example" of the synthesized Europop sound and said it is "almost hypnotic". British magazine Music Week rated it four out of five, saying, "This year's red hot record in the European holiday resorts is a feast of sleazy camp. Once heard, never forgotten and, hence, a huge UK hit." 

James Hyman from the magazine's RM Dance Update commented, "Prize candidate for novelty pop record of the year. With the camp, male monotone title hook added to female operatic vocals of 'you are young, you are free; why don't you sleep with me?', this record's simplicity is further reinforced with a gentle tinkling piano." He also added that the George Morel remix "wisely keeps the vocals and whoops things up into a tamer version of Armand van Helden's 'Witch Doctor'." Another editor, James Hamilton described it as a "ambivalent sexual proposition lisped through Somerville'ish whinnying". 

The Song was included in the soundtrack of the German film Silvester Countdown, released in 1997.

Chart performance
"Shut Up (and Sleep with Me)" was very successful on the charts in Europe, peaking at number-one in Austria, Finland, Lithuania and Spain, where it spent five weeks at the top position. In Belgium, it was a number two hit, staying for four weeks at that position. The single reached the Top 10 also in Denmark, Germany, Italy, the Netherlands, Sweden and Switzerland, as well as on the Eurochart Hot 100 and MTV's European Top 20, where it hit number ten and three. Additionally, it was a Top 50 hit in Scotland and the UK. In the latter, it peaked at number 44 in its first week at the UK Singles Chart, on 10 September 1995. On the UK Dance Singles Chart, the song was a bigger hit, reaching number 36. Outside Europe, it peaked at number-one in Mexico, number two on the RPM Dance/Urban chart in Canada and number 26 on the Billboard Hot Dance Club Play chart in the US.

Music video
A music video was produced to promote the song, directed by Austrian director Matthias Schweger. There was also made a similar video for the remix by George Morel. It was later published on YouTube in March 2018, and by September 2021, it had more than 2.6 million views.

Track listing

 12" single, UK & Europe (1995)
 "Shut Up (and Sleep with Me)" (George Morel's Club Mix) – 7:17
 "Shut Up (and Sleep with Me)" (Gym Shower Mix) – 6:28
 "Shut Up (and Sleep with Me)" (Ian Levine Mix) – 5:13

 CD single, Europe (1995)
 "Shut Up (and Sleep with Me)" (Airplay Mix) – 3:45
 "Shut Up (and Sleep with Me)" (George Morel's Dub Mix) – 7:17

 CD maxi, Europe (1995)
 "Shut Up (and Sleep with Me)" (Airplay Mix) – 3:45
 "Shut Up (and Sleep with Me)" (YMCA Mix) – 5:25
 "Shut Up (and Sleep with Me)" (Kaspar's Camp Mix) – 5:12
 "Shut Up (and Sleep with Me)" (Gym Shower Mix) – 6:28

 CD maxi - Remixes, Europe (1995)
 "Shut Up (and Sleep with Me)" (George Morel's Club Mix) – 7:17
 "Shut Up (and Sleep with Me)" (George Morel's Dub Mix) – 7:17
 "Shut Up (and Sleep with Me)" (George Morel's Video Edit) – 3:55
 "Shut Up (and Sleep with Me)" (Gym Shower Mix) – 6:33
 "Shut Up (and Sleep with Me)" (Kaspar's Camp Mix) – 5:08
 "Shut Up (and Sleep with Me)" (Ian Levine Mix) – 5:13
 "Shut Up (and Sleep with Me)" (YMCA Mix) – 5:25
 "Shut Up (and Sleep with Me)" (George Morel's Alternative Club Mix) – 6:33

Charts

Weekly charts

Year-end charts

References

1995 debut singles
1995 songs
Sin With Sebastian songs
Number-one singles in Austria
Number-one singles in Finland
Number-one singles in Spain
Music videos directed by Matthias Schweger